Alaskan is a demonym for a person from the U.S. state of Alaska.

Alaskan or Alaskans may also refer to:

In arts and entertainment
 The Alaskans, an American Western television series
 The Alaskan, a 1924 silent adventure drama
 Jay York, nicknamed "The Alaskan", a professional wrestler of the 1960s and 1970s

Companies
 Alaskan Brewing Company, a large craft brewery based in Juneau, Alaska
 Denali Alaskan Federal Credit Union, a credit union based in Anchorage, Alaska; a predecessor was known as the Alaskan Federal Credit Union from 1984 to 1997

Firearms and ammunition
 Ruger Alaskan, a revolver introduced in 2005
 .50 Alaskan, an ammunition cartridge dating from the 1950s

Places
 Alaskan Hotel and Bar in Juneau, Alaska, listed on the National Register of Historic Places in Alaska
 Alaskan Way, a street in Seattle, Washington

Vehicles
 Alaskan (sidewheeler), a steamship which operated from 1884 to 1889
 Renault Alaskan, a French mid-size pickup truck
 , a U.S. Navy cargo ship and troop transport in commission from 1918 to 1919

See also
 Alaska (disambiguation)